There were 140 qualifying places available for archery at the 2016 Summer Paralympics: 80 for men and 60 for women.

Each National Paralympic Committee (NPC) is permitted to enter a maximum of 13 competitors, 8 male, 5 female. NPC can enter a further two female athletes in Women's Compound W1 or Compound Open as World individual or mixed team champion in that event, so a theoretical maximum of fifteen archers is possible across the nine events.

NPCs that qualify at least a single individual man and woman in a specific discipline - Compound W1, Compound Open or Recurve Open - are able to enter a two-member mixed team to the relevant team event, while also having each member compete in the individual event. If an NPC qualifies multiple archers in each gender in a specific discipline, however, they remain restricted to a single team in the mixed team event in that discipline.

Six places are reserved for Brazil as the host nation, one in each individual event, and as a consequence, Brazil will enter a team in each of the Mixed Pairs events. A further eleven will be decided by the Bipartite Commission. The remaining 123 places are then allocated through a qualification process, in which archers earned quota places for their respective NPCs, though not necessarily for themselves.

To be eligible to participate in the Paralympic Games after the NPC has obtained a quota place, all archers must be classified with a confirmed or review sports status, to ensure Paralympic eligibility, and have achieved a minimum qualification score (MQS):

Men's Ind. Compound W1: 575
Men's Ind. Compound Open: 630
Men's Ind. Recurve Open: 560
Women's Ind. Compound W1: 500
Women's Ind. Compound Open: 600
Women's Ind. Recurve Open: 520

The MQS must have been achieved between 1 July 2015 and 1 July 2016.

Timeline

Qualification details

Places are awarded to the NPC, not the individual athlete. Where an athlete's name appears, the athlete's NPC has selected that athlete to take this place in Rio; this athlete may or may not have gained the qualification.

* extra place available to world champions (individual or mixed pairs) only. Max 1 per NPC for all other nations.
Following the McLaren Report on State sponsored doping in Russia, the  Paralympic team was excluded from the Games. As a consequence, Russian qualifiers in Archery were excluded.

Mixed team events

There is no direct qualification for the mixed pairs events, and an NPC may enter one team (1 man, 1 woman) per event if they have qualified those archers from individual events. However, since Rio 2016 quota places in individual events were awarded to the top finishers in the equivalent mixed pairs event at the 2015 World Para Archery Championships in Donau, Germany, a minimum number of teams per event is guaranteed.

On 5 September 2016, the IPC published the full entry lists for all mixed team events in archery. The following teams will enter:

References

Qualification